Gao Jing (born September 18, 1975) is a Chinese sport shooter. She won the Bronze Medal in 10 m air rifle in the 2000 Summer Olympics in Sydney.

References

1975 births
Living people
Chinese female sport shooters
ISSF rifle shooters
Shooters at the 2000 Summer Olympics
Olympic shooters of China
Olympic bronze medalists for China
Olympic medalists in shooting
Asian Games medalists in shooting
Shooters at the 2002 Asian Games
Medalists at the 2000 Summer Olympics
Asian Games gold medalists for China
Asian Games silver medalists for China
Medalists at the 2002 Asian Games
Sport shooters from Tianjin
21st-century Chinese women